Svinje is an album by the Serbian noise-rock band Klopka Za Pionira, released in 2007 (see 2007 in music) on the Ne-ton independent label. It contains eight songs of which some are new versions of songs from the previous album Kupine with significant changes in both music and lyrics. The sound on this album is rich and multi-layered with extensive use of sampling, tape-loops, static noise etc. unexpectedly intercepted by soothing harmonic melodies of instruments such as xylophone. Svinje is the Serbian word for pigs. 


Track listing
All lyrics by Mileta Mijatović and music by Klopka Za Pionira
"Schwartzhörer" – 5:30
"Šta me gledaš" – 6:20
"Civilizacija" – 7:15
"Palestina" – 6:54
"Tortura" – 6:12
"Životinje" – 5:43
"Super za svinje" – 8:19
"Božić" – 5:54

Personnel
Mileta Mijatović - vocals 
Damjan Brkić - guitar, drum machine
Vladimir Lenhart - bass guitar, tapes

References

External links 
 Free streaming of the album on the official website

Klopka Za Pionira albums
2007 albums